The 2022 Arkansas Senate elections took place as part of the biennial 2022 United States elections. Arkansas voters elected state senators to the Arkansas Senate in 18 of the state's 35 senate districts. The primary elections in March 2022, determined which candidates would appear on the November 8, 2022, general election ballot.

Composition

Retirements

Democrats
District 10: Larry Teague retired.
District 24: Keith Ingram retired.
District 31: Joyce Elliott retired.

Independents
District 2: Jim Hendren retired.

Republicans
District 3: Cecile Bledsoe retired.
District 7: Colby Fulfer retired.
District 8: Mathew Pitsch retired to run for treasurer of Arkansas.
District 27: Trent Garner retired.
District 35: Jason Rapert retired to run for lieutenant governor of Arkansas.

Incumbents defeated

In primaries

Republicans
District 3: Charles Beckham lost renomination to Steve Crowell after being redistricted from District 12.
District 6: Bill Sample lost renomination to Matt McKee after being redistricted from District 14.
District 22: James Sturch lost renomination to John Payton after being redistricted from District 19.
District 28: Bob Ballinger lost renomination to Bryan King after being redistricted from District 5.

Predictions

Summary

Closest races 
Seats where the margin of victory was under 10%:

Detailed results

District 1

District 2

District 3

District 4

District 5

District 6

District 7

District 8

District 9

District 10

District 11

District 12

District 13

District 14

District 15

District 16

District 17

District 18

District 19

District 20

District 21

District 22

District 23

District 24

District 25

District 26

District 27

District 28

District 29

District 30

District 31

District 32

District 33

District 34

District 35

See also
 2022 Arkansas elections
 2022 Arkansas House of Representatives election
 Arkansas Senate

References

External links

Senate
Arkansas Senate
Arkansas Senate elections